Warwick Business School (WBS) is an academic department of the Faculty of Social Sciences of Warwick University, that was established in 1967 as the School of Industrial and Business Studies. 

The Business School offers undergraduate, postgraduate and PhD degree programs, and non-degree executive education for individuals and companies. The Warwick MBA is offered as a one-year full-time program, an Executive MBA and by distance learning (blended learning).

WBS University of Warwick campus is on the border of the city of Coventry and the county of Warwickshire in a semi-rural green belt location. WBS London campus is located in The Shard Tower, one of the tallest buildings in Europe.

Warwick graduates are active in business. In the automotive industry, this includes CEO of Aston Martin; Ralf Speth, CEO of Jaguar Land Rover; Linda Jackson, CEO of Citroën; Andy Palmer. Others include Bernardo Hees, CEO of the Heinz Company & former CEO of Burger King.

History
Warwick's School of Industrial and Business Studies (SIBS) was founded in 1967, with Brian Houlden as Chair, a total of five academic staff and 24 students across three programmes (MSc Management & Business Studies, MSc Management Science & Operational Research, Doctoral programme). It quickly gained a reputation for excellent research, particularly in the field of industrial relations. The Industrial Relations Research Unit, founded by Hugh Clegg in 1970 focused on achieving a better understanding of workplace industrial relations in general and workplace trade unionism in particular, in a time when the UK was perceived to suffer greatly from industrial strife and poor economic performance.

In 1981, the MSc in Management was renamed the Warwick MBA. At its 20th anniversary in 1987, SIBS was renamed Warwick Business School. The department had grown to over 100 staff, 815 students and 11 programs. In 1997, following expansion of the distance learning MBA in particular, the staff tally was over 260, with 3,160 students across 17 programs.

In 2000, a new Executive MBA teaching centre was opened, the first of four phases of development of new premises for WBS. Further phases opened in 2001 and 2006, increasing the teaching capacity of WBS dramatically. This was followed by aggressive recruitment of academic faculty. In 2006, there were a total of 319 staff and 7,539 students across 25 degree programs, from over 100 countries worldwide.

In September 2014, WBS opened a second campus in The Shard in London to teach its MSc Finance, MSc Human Resource Management and Employment Relations along with its Executive MBA courses.

In August 2015, WBS opened Phase 3b of its Scarman Road building on the University of Warwick campus. The £30m extension houses a 292-seat lecture theatre with a removable stage, a 120-seat lecture theatre which contains swivel chairs to allow for group work, a Behavioural Science Laboratory, a 150-seater café, nine seminar rooms, undergraduate and post-graduate learning spaces and four open plan offices for management and support staff plus a new reception.

Research
WBS is included in the world's Top 100 Business Schools that prioritize sustainability education by supporting core curriculum choices, dedicated institutes, and relevant faculty research. WBS is also included in the UTD Top 100 worldwide business school rankings based on research contributions. Its one of only 3 UK business schools to be awarded the top five-star (5*) research rating by the Higher Education Funding Council for England, the others being London Business School and Lancaster School of Management.

Warwick Business School is consistently recognised as one of the world's leading research institutions in business and management. In the 2014 Research Excellence Framework more than 80 per cent of WBS's research output has been judged ‘World Leading’ or ‘Internationally Excellent’. The 2008 Research Assessment Exercise positioned Warwick in the top ranks for business and management research 

WBS is a founding member of the Academy of Business in Society where primary research can be applied directly into business practices.

As of 2016, 100% of the WBS academic faculty have a doctoral degree, 54% are active researchers in the top 45 academic and practitioner journals whilst 76% are international academics. All academics are members of a teaching subject group, a research centre or unit, and often both. Each teaching subject group has a group convenor or head, and devolved group management. Each research centre has a director, and has similarly devolved management. Research centres may have a board with external representation to ensure practical relevance of research strategy.

Accreditation
In 2000, WBS became the first UK business school to hold Triple accreditation: the Association to Advance Collegiate Schools of Business AACSB, the Association of MBAs AMBA, and the European Quality Improvement System EQUIS.

Admission 
Warwick BS is highly selective; selection criteria encompass candidates' academics, professional experience, and test scores. It has a median GMAT score of 660 and an average admission rate of 29%. The school says that it seeks critical thinking skills along with creativity in its applicant pool. A typical ratio on the MBA is 36% British, 14% EU and 50% non-EU; the median age is 31.

Partnerships
Warwick Business School is a member of the Partnership in International Management network (PIMS).

Notable people

Academic staff
:
 Steve Alpern: Professor of Operational Research
 Söhnke M. Bartram: Professor of Finance
 Sir Jonathan Bate: Fellow of Creativity and Provost of Worcester College, Oxford
 Colin Crouch: Emeritus Professor of Governance and Public Management
 Graham Loomes: Professor of Economics and Behavioural Science
 Tobias Preis: Associate Professor of Behavioral Science and Finance
 Andrew Sentance CBE: Professor of Practice in Sustainable Business, Senior Economic Advisor at PwC, Former Monetary Policy Committee member of The Bank of England
 Mark P. Taylor: Professor of Finance, former Senior Economist at the International Monetary Fund and Bank of England
 Catherine Waddams: formerly Director of the Centre for Management under Regulation

Alumni
 Andy Haldane, Chief Economist and the Executive Director of Monetary Analysis and Statistics at the Bank of England
 Aung Tun Thet , Myanmar Economist and Management Consultant
 Bernardo Hees, CEO of Heinz & former CEO of Burger King
 Nigel Wilson, CEO of Legal & General Group plc
 Judith Clegg, founder and CEO of Takeout, and founder of The Glasshouse
 Linda Jackson, CEO of Citroën
 Idris Jala, Government of Malaysia Minister & former CEO of Malaysia Airlines 
 Lord Gus O'Donnell, former Cabinet Secretary and Head of the Civil Service
 Max McKeown, author, consultant and researcher specializing in innovation strategy, leadership and culture
 George Yankey, CEO of Ghana Gas Company & former Minister of Health
 Reza Moghadam, Director of the European Department of the International Monetary Fund
 Sean Clarke, CEO of Asda supermarket retailer (a Walmart subsidiary)
 Mahmoud Mohieldin, World Bank Special Envoy on Millennium Development Goals
 Lord Brian Paddick, former Commissioner, Metropolitan Police, and London Mayoral candidate for the Liberal Democrats in 2008 and 2012
 Ralf Speth, CEO of Jaguar Land Rover

Deans
Brian Houlden (1967–1973)
Roger Fawthrop (1973–1976)
Derek Waterworth (1976–1978)
Robert Dyson (1978–1981)
Thom Watson (1981–1983)
Sir George Bain (1983–1989)
Robin Wensley (1989–1994)
Robert Galliers (1994–1998)
Robert Dyson (1998–2000)
Howard Thomas (2000–2010)
Mark P. Taylor (2010–2016)
Andy Lockett (2016–present)

See also
 List of business schools in Europe

References

Business School
Business schools in England
Educational institutions established in 1967
1967 establishments in England